Aap Kay Liye is an ARY Digital drama serial first aired 16 August 2016 Starring Faryal Mehmood, Arij Fatyma, and Faisal Qureshi.

Plot 
Shaheer is a sophisticated rich business man but his property becomes the reason of his divorce, and that's where the story begins. Shaheer's own sister – along with her husband creates problems in his life because she is after his property. Washma who is a colleague to him comes in his life and falls in love with him.

Although she belongs to a very middle-class family but they get along and eventually marry each other. But this class difference and the past remains a problem in their relationship. "Shaheer will be older than Washma with much more experience in life but in few matters Washma seems more sensible than him. Basically Shaheer is simple and can trust others easily."

Although Washma is too young but she has an eye and sense to judge others.' Samina Peerzada just played the role of a very majbur aurat in the play Beqasoor but in this play her character will have more room for performance and the viewers will get to see her in a character which has more to offer than Sadaf of Beqasoor. Talking about her character Faiza Iftikhar said, "It is a sort of negative character but not evil. There is also nand bhabi taakra but not in a typical way.'"

Cast 
 Faryal Mehmood as Shaheer's first Wife
 Arij Fatima as Washma Shaheer's wife 
 Faisal Qureshi as Shaheer
 Salma Hassan as Bhabi
 Waseem Abbas as Imdad
 Ghana Ali as Areesha
 Samina Peerzada as Nishat
Saife Hassan as Washma Brother

Schedule 
Aap Kay Liye airs Tuesdays at 9:00 pm on ARY Digital.

References

External links 

 

2016 Pakistani television series debuts
Pakistani drama television series
2016 Pakistani television series endings
ARY Digital original programming
ARY Digital